Bandgah-e Pir Sohrab (also Romanized as Bandgāh-e Pīr Sohrāb; also known as Pīr Sohrāb) is a village in Pir Sohrab Rural District, in the Central District of Chabahar County, Sistan and Baluchestan Province, Iran. At the 2006 census, its population was 275, in 56 families.

References 

Populated places in Chabahar County